Svetlana Kulikova (born November 14, 1980) is a Russian former competitive ice dancer. With Arseni Markov, she is the 2001 Winter Universiade bronze medalist and 2002 Skate Canada International bronze medalist. With Vitali Novikov, she is the 2003 Nebelhorn Trophy champion.

Career 
Kulikova teamed up with Markov in 1996. They placed 6th at the 2000 World Junior Championships. Following the 2000–2001 season, Kulikova and Markov moved to Newington, Connecticut, to train full-time with Tatiana Tarasova and Nikolai Morozov. They won the bronze medal at the 2002 Skate Canada International. They parted ways after the 2003 Russian Championships as a result of Tarasova and Morozov ending their coaching partnership – Kulikova chose to stay with Tarasova while Markov chose Morozov. 

Kulikova and Novikov teamed up in January 2003. They won the first competition they entered as a team, the 2003 Nebelhorn Trophy. They won two medals at the Russian Championships and competed twice at the European and World Championships. Their best results were 7th at 2005 Europeans and 13th at 2004 Worlds. Kulikova / Novikov were coached by Tatiana Tarasova and Evgeni Platov. They parted ways after placing 14th at the 2005 World Championships.

Kulikova lives in the United States where she works as a choreographer.

Programs

With Novikov

With Markov

Results
GP: Grand Prix; JGP: Junior Grand Prix

With Novikov

With Markov

References

External links 

 
 

1980 births
Living people
Russian female ice dancers
Universiade medalists in figure skating
Figure skaters from Moscow
Universiade bronze medalists for Russia
Competitors at the 2001 Winter Universiade